Belyando was an electoral district of the Legislative Assembly in the Australian state of Queensland in 2 incarnations from 1950 to 1977.

It was first created in the 1949 redistribution preceding the 1950 election, covering the central Queensland area around the Shire of Belyando. It was abolished in the redistribution preceding the 1960 election, its territory taken up by the district of Barcoo expanding eastward.

It was revived again in the 1971 redistribution, and was renamed Peak Downs from the 1977 election onwards.

It is pronounced Bel-yando.

Members for Belyando

Election results

See also
 Electoral districts of Queensland
 Members of the Queensland Legislative Assembly by year
 :Category:Members of the Queensland Legislative Assembly by name

References

Former electoral districts of Queensland